Hubert Leander Powell III (known as Doobie Powell) is an independent gospel music artist. He has worked with other gospel artists such as Kim Burrell, The Clark Sisters, Tonex, Tye Tribbett, Kelly Price, Tramaine Hawkins and John P. Kee. He has released three independent albums and is the founder of Chip Off The Block Productions, LLC.

Biography
According to his website, Doobie was born to Hubert Powell Jr. (Gospel Jazz Great) and Jacquelyn Powell (Powerhouse Vocalist) in Harford, CT. His musical journey began at the tender age of two, influenced by the musical prowess of his parents who exposed Doobie to many genres of music.

The Offspring (2002) 
The Offspring is the debut album of Doobie Powell, released underground on September 21, 2002

For The Love Of It All (2003)  
For The Love Of It All is the second album of Doobie Powell, released in 2003.

The Offspring (Volume 1) (2005) 
This is the public re-release of the album The Offspring released in 2002 .

Personnel: 
Doobie Powell - Vocals/Keyboard

Johnny DuBoise - guitar

Jerod Howard - Fender Rhodes piano, organ

Kevin Powell - organ

Ace Livingston - bass guitar

Brandon Alexander Hodge  - bass guitar

Billy Powell - percussion

Denise Renee Powell - background vocals

Courtney Williams - background vocals

4 Zoe (2007) 

4 Zoe is the fourth album from Doobie Powell, released in 2007. It was released on Chip Off The Block records and has a runtime of 52 minutes, and 12 tracks.

The Time Is Now (2009) 
The Time Is Now is Doobie Powell's first nationwide release and was due to be released on January 13, 2009. It was recorded at Education Center for the Arts in New Haven, CT on October 24, 2008.

Personal life

Together with the late Ebony Powell he has a daughter, Diamond L. Powell. Doobie is the Minister of Music at Latter Rain Christian Fellowship in Hartford, CT where his parents are the pastors.

References 

Living people
1975 births